George Henry Tatham Paton VC MC (3 October 1895 – 1 December 1917) was a Scottish recipient of the Victoria Cross, the highest and most prestigious award for gallantry in the face of the enemy that can be awarded to British and Commonwealth forces. Paton was the first Grenadier Guards officer to win the VC since the Crimean War.

He was born to George William Paton who was Deputy Chairman and Managing Director of Messrs Bryant and May Ltd and was educated at Rottingdean School and Clifton College Bristol.

Paton was 22 years old, and an acting captain in the 4th Battalion, Grenadier Guards, British Army during the First World War when the following deed took place for which he was awarded the VC.

On 1 December 1917 at Gonnelieu, France, when a unit on Captain Paton's left was driven back, thus leaving his flank in the air and his company practically surrounded, he walked up and down adjusting the line, within 50 yards of the enemy, under a withering fire. He personally removed several wounded men and was the last to leave the village. Later he again adjusted the line and when the enemy counter-attacked four times, each time sprang on to the parapet, deliberately risking his life, in order to stimulate his men. He was eventually mortally wounded.

His Victoria Cross is displayed at the Guards Regimental Headquarters (Grenadier Guards RHQ) at Wellington Barracks, London.

Notes

References
 Buzzell, Nora (1997). The Register of the Victoria Cross.
 Harvey, David (1999). Monuments to Courage.
 Ross, Graham (1995). Scotland's Forgotten Valour.

1895 births
1917 deaths
People educated at Clifton College
British World War I recipients of the Victoria Cross
Recipients of the Military Cross
Grenadier Guards officers
British Army personnel of World War I
British military personnel killed in World War I
People from Innellan
London Regiment officers
British Army recipients of the Victoria Cross